Gardens by the Bay MRT station is an underground Mass Rapid Transit (MRT) station on the Thomson–East Coast line (TEL). Located in Marina South, Singapore, the station serves Gardens by the Bay and Marina Barrage.

First announced in August 2012 as part of the Thomson line (TSL), the station was constructed as part of TEL Phase 3 (TEL 3) with the merger of the TSL and the Eastern Region line. The station opened on 13 November 2022. The station features an Art-in-Transit Planting Shadows by Vertical Submarine.

History
The station was first announced on 29 August 2012 as part of the Thomson line (TSL). Contract T228 for the design and construction of Gardens by the Bay Station and associated tunnels was awarded to Nishimatsu Construction Co. Ltd – Bachy Soletanche Singapore Pte Ltd Joint Venture at S$331 million (US$ million) in July 2014. Construction started in 2014, with an initial set completion date of 2021.

On 15 August 2014, the Land Transport Authority (LTA) announced that the TSL would merge with the Eastern Region line to form the Thomson–East Coast line (TEL). Gardens by the Bay station, part of the proposed line, would be constructed as part of TEL 3, consisting of 13 stations from Mount Pleasant to this station. With restrictions imposed on construction due to the COVID-19 pandemic, the TEL 3 completion date was pushed by one year to 2022. 

On 9 March 2022, Transport Minister S Iswaran announced in Parliament that TEL 3 would open in the second half of that year.

Details
Gardens by the Bay station is the current terminus of the TEL, with the adjacent station being Marina Bay station. The station code is TE22. Being part of the TEL, the station is operated by SMRT Trains. Train frequencies range from 5 to 6 minutes. 

The station has three entrances serving Gardens by the Bay and the Marina Barrage. The station features 288 bicycle parking lots, and is a designated Civil Defence shelter.

An Art-in-Transit artwork Planting Shadows by Vertical Submarine features shadows of tropical plants. Adapted from drawings of plants during Singapore's colonial era, the artwork intends to connect the past with the present Gardens by the Bay, while calling to attention the absence of nature in Singapore's urban environment.

References

External links

Mass Rapid Transit (Singapore) stations
Railway stations in Singapore opened in 2022